Benton Hall may refer to:
 Benton Jay Hall (1835–1894), U.S. Representative from Iowa
 Benton Hall (Miami University)
 Benton Hall (Oregon State University)